Caroline Vu is a Canadian novelist of Vietnamese heritage.

Early life and education
Vu was born in 1959 in Dalat, Vietnam (South Vietnam) and grew up in Saigon. At the age of eleven, she immigrated with her mother and brother to Connecticut where her mother worked on as a resident physician. At the age of thirteen, the family relocated to Montreal, Quebec, Canada.

She has degrees in Political Science from McGill University and in Psychology from Concordia University, and a degree in medicine from the University of Montreal.

Career
Vu's writings deal with issues of identity and memory, and immigration from Asia (especially Vietnam) to Canada. Her first novel, Palawan Story, was published by the Deux Voiliers Publishing collective in 2014. It won the 2016 Fred Kerner Book Award for the best book by a member of the Canadian Authors Association and was a finalist for the 2014 Concordia University First Book Prize awarded by the Quebec Writers' Federation. Palawan Story was translated and published in French by Les Éditions de la Pleine Lune in August 2017.

The novel takes its name from the island of Palawan in the Philippines, where over half a million Vietnamese refugees were placed in a camp during the period from 1979 to 1993. It tells the story of a young girl named Kim who through a stroke of luck is able to leave the camp at Palawan and build a life for herself first in Connecticut and then in Montreal, struggling as an adult to comprehend the chaotic history of her homeland that she had glimpsed through the eyes of a child. The book offers a down-to-earth understanding of what it was like to live in the transition from American to Viet Cong dominance of South Vietnam, and of how historical events are refracted in the lives of ordinary people.

Vu's second novel, That Summer in Provincetown, was published in 2015 in English by Guernica Editions. In 2016, Les Éditions de la Pleine Lune published the French translation, Un été à Provincetown. It is about three generations of a Vietnamese family who immigrate from Vietnam to Canada. As one family member named Daniel, child of a Vietnamese father and French mother, lies dying of AIDS in a Montreal hospital after contracting the disease in the gay mecca of 1970s Provincetown, long hidden secrets are revealed, with each chapter telling the story of a different member of his extended family. As in Vu's first novel, Provincetown gives human insight into Vietnamese history, but it covers a wider swathe of the past, from French colonialism, through Japanese occupation and then the long civil war between the North and the South that stretched into what is still referred to in Vietnam as the American War.

Vu has also published articles in a variety of newspapers, including The Medical Post, the Toronto Star, the Montreal Gazette, The Geneva Times, and The Tico Times.

Bibliography
Palawan Story (novel) 2014
 That Summer in Provinceton (novel) 2015
 Un été à Provincetown (translated novel) 2016 – French translation of That Summer in Provincetown
 Palawan (translated novel) 2017 – French Translation of Palawan Story
 Television Voices (short story) 2017

Personal life
Vu practices medicine in Montreal, where she lives with her two daughters. She is the widow of Mario Laguë, who was Canadian ambassador to Costa Rica from 2004 to 2007 and later the director of communications to Michael Ignatieff, the former leader of the Liberal Party of Canada.

References

Living people
1959 births
Vietnamese emigrants to Canada
21st-century Canadian women writers
Canadian writers of Asian descent
Writers from Montreal
Canadian women novelists
21st-century Canadian novelists
Université de Montréal alumni
Concordia University alumni